Erycinidae is a taxonomic synonym that may refer to:

 The Riodinidae, a family of butterflies
 The Erycinae, a subfamily of boid snakes